Good-Bye Broadway, Hello France is a 1917 song composed by Billy Baskette, with lyrics written by C. Francis Reisner and Benny Davis. The song was published by Leo Feist, Inc.

Performances 
The song was included in The Passing Show of 1917 as part of the finale.

The song was performed by The American Quartet and reached No. 1 on the top 100 songs of 1917. Other covers include those by The Peerless Quartet, (No. 5 on 1917 top 100), Arthur Fields (1917), and Jaudus' Society Orchestra (1918).

The song inspired Irving Berlin's 1918 hit, "Goodbye, France," a song about leaving France to return to the United States.

While the song was popular during its time, it also saw a revival during World War II, where some soldiers preferred World War I songs over the war songs being produced at the time.

In film 
The song was used in Tin Pan Alley, a 1940 musical film.

In 1942, the song was featured in the film For Me and My Gal starring Judy Garland and Gene Kelly.

Sheet music 

The sheet music was reprinted more than ten times.

Cover art and analysis
The 1917 publication featured an illustration cover by Rosenbaum Studios, which featured John J. Pershing and Joseph Joffre shaking hands across the ocean with the Statue of Liberty and the Eiffel Tower in the background.
 
On the back of one of the song edition's cover was an ad by Leo Feist which declared "MUSIC WILL HELP WIN THE WAR!", as well as an essay by "A. Patriot" which explained the meaning of the song. The song was meant to lift the nation's spirit and fight off fatigue and worry by promoting the American war effort in Europe.

See also 
 List of best-selling sheet music

References

External links
Good-Bye Broadway, Hello France 
view the song MP3 and sheet music here

1917 songs
Songs of World War I
Songs with music by Billy Baskette
Songs written by Benny Davis